Alejandro is the Spanish form of the name Alexander.

Alejandro has multiple variations in different languages, including Aleksander (Czech, Polish), Alexandre (French), Alexandros (Greek), Alsander (Irish), Alessandro (Italian), Aleksandr (Russian), and Alasdair (Gaelic).

People with the given name Alejandro 
 Alejandro Alvizuri, Peruvian backstroke swimmer
 Alejandro Amenábar, Chilean-born Spanish director
 Alejandro Aranda, American singer, musician, and reality television personality
 Alejandro Arguello, Mexican footballer
 Alejandro Avila, Mexican TV actor
 Alejandro Awada, Argentine actor
 Alejandro Betts, Argentine historian
 Alejandro Bermúdez, Colombian swimmer
 Alejandro Bustillo, Argentine architect
 Alejandro Carrión, Ecuadorian poet and novelist
 Alejandro Casañas, Cuban hurdler
 Alejandro Castillo, Mexican footballer
 Alejandro Cercas, Spanish politician
 Alejandro Chataing, Venezuelan architect
 Alejandro Cichero, Venezuelan footballer
 Alejandro Corichi, Mexican theoretical physicist
 Alejandro Cortés, Colombian road cyclist
 Alejandro Cruz (disambiguation), several people
 Alejandro Diz, Argentine volleyball player
 Alejandro Doherty, Argentine field hockey player
 Alejandro Dolina, Argentine broadcaster
 Alejandro Domínguez, former chief of police in Nuevo Laredo, Mexico
 Alejandro Edda, Mexican-American actor
 Alejandro Escovedo, American singer-songwriter
 Alejandro Falla, Colombian tennis player
 Alejandro Felipe Paula, Netherlands Antilles politician and historian
 Alejandro Fernández, Mexican singer
 Alejandro Fernández Sordo, Spanish politician
 Alejandro Freire, Venezuelan-American baseball player
 Alejandro García (disambiguation), several people
 Alejandro González Iñárritu, Mexican director
 Alejandro Walter González, Argentine road cyclist
 Alejandro Gorostiaga, Chilean military
 Alejandro Herrera (Heroes), fictional character in NBC's Heroes
 Alejandro Herrera (athlete) (born 1958), Cuban athlete
 Alejandro Jodorowsky, Chilean actor and director
 Alejandro Kirk, Mexican baseball player
 Alejandro Agustín Lanusse, former Argentine President
 Alejandro Lazo, Cuban-American dancer
 Alejandro Lerner, Argentine musician
 Alejandro Lerroux, Spanish politician
 Alejandro González Malavé, Puerto Rican undercover police agent
 Alejandro Martinez, Andorran punk rock guitarist and back-up singer in Anonymous
 Alejandro Manzano, lead singer in Puerto Rican-American alternative rock band Boyce Avenue
 Alejandro Mayorkas, U.S. Secretary of the Department of Homeland Security
 Alejandro Meloño, Uruguayan footballer
 Alejandro Moreno, Venezuelan footballer
 Alejandro Muñoz-Alonso, Spanish politician
 Alejandro Naif, Palestinian footballer
 Alejandro Obregón, Colombian painter, muralist, sculptor, and engraver
 Alejandro O'Reilly, Irish-born Spanish governor of colonial Louisiana
 Alejandro Orfila, Argentine diplomat
 Alejandro Ortuoste, Filipino boxer
 Alejandro Padilla, American politician
 Alejandro Cao de Benos de Les y Pérez, president of the Korean Friendship Association
 Alejandro Planchart, Venezuelan-American musicologist and composer
 Alejandro Portes, Cuban-American sociologist
 Alejandro Pozuelo, Spanish footballer
 Alejandro Ramírez (chess player), Costa Rican international grandmaster of chess
 Alejandro Ramírez Calderón, Colombian road cyclist
 Alejandro Rebollo Álvarez-Amandi, Spanish lawyer, civil servant and politician
 Alejandro Rey, Argentine actor
 Alejandro Rivera, NCIS character
 Alejandro Tapia y Rivera, Puerto Rican poet and writer
 Alejandro Encinas Rodríguez, Mexican politician
 Alejandro Rossi, Mexican writer
 Alejandro Saab, American voice actor
 Alejandro Sabella, Argentine footballer
 Alejandro Salazar, American footballer
 Alejandro Sanz, Spanish pop musician
 Alejandro Siqueiros, Mexican freestyle swimmer
 Alejandro Severo, the Spanish version of Alexander Severus, former Roman emperor
 Alejandro M. Sinibaldi, President of Guatemala
 Alejandro Siri, Argentine field hockey player
 Alejandro Sosa, fictional drug lord from the 1983 film Scarface
 Alejandro Spajic, Argentine volleyball player
 Alejandro de la Sota, Spanish architect
 Alejandro Toledo, Peruvian politician, ex-president
 Alejandro de Tomaso, Argentine auto racing driver
 Alejandro Valverde, Spanish cyclist
 Rey Alejandro Conde Valdivia, Mexican conductor
 Alejandro Velasco Astete, Peruvian pilot
 Alejandro Villanueva, NFL Offensive tackle, and former Army Ranger
 Alejandro Zaera, Spanish architect
 Alejandro Zohn, Mexican architect

See also 
 
 Alejandro Sniper Rifle
 Alexandro
 Alexandre (disambiguation)
 Alexander
 Alessandro
 Sandro

References 

Spanish masculine given names